Patrice Adora McNair (born March 13, 1989), known under the ring name Trish Adora, is an American professional wrestler currently working as a freelancer. She is the inaugural and current Pan-Afrikan World Diaspora Wrestling World Champion in her first reign. She has also wrestled in numerous promotions such as All Elite Wrestling, Ring of Honor, Game Changer Wrestling, and Progress Wrestling.

Early life and career
Prior to her wrestling career, McNair served eight years in the United States Army.

Professional wrestling career

McNair made her wrestling debut in 2016 under the ring name Trish Adora.

F1ght Club (2019–present) 
On February 15, 2020, Adora became the Pan-Afrikan World Diaspora Wrestling World Champion in a tournament final.

Ring of Honor (2021-) 
In May 2021, Adora began appearing for Ring of Honor. She competed in the ROH Women's World Championship tournament, where she defeated Marti Belle and Allysin Kay in the first round and quarterfinal respectively. However, she lost to Miranda Alize in the semifinals.

On December 10, 2022, Adora was defeated by Willow Nightingale during the Final Battle pre-show.

All Elite Wrestling (2021–2022)
Adora first appeared for All Elite Wrestling (AEW) on the November 22 episode of Dark: Elevation losing to Riho.

Championship and accomplishments
	Generation Championship Wrestling
GCW Women's Championship (1 time)
	PAWDWC Presents F1ght Club Pro Wrestling
Pan-Afrikan World Diaspora Wrestling World Championship (1 time, current)
Pro Wrestling Illustrated
 Ranked No. 18 of the top 150 female wrestlers in the PWI Women's 150 in 2021
Ranked No. 50 of the top 500 singles wrestlers in the PWI 500 in 2022

References

External links 
 

1989 births
Living people
Professional wrestlers from Washington, D.C.
American female professional wrestlers
African-American female professional wrestlers
Female United States Army personnel
LGBT professional wrestlers
21st-century professional wrestlers